Nostalgic 64 is the debut studio album by American rapper Denzel Curry. It was released on September 3, 2013.

Production
Producers who contributed to this album include Rem, Ronny J, MarkMC9, Poshstronaut, Klvn Tyler, Nuri, Steven A. Clark, J Green, Freebase, Lofty305 and Sydneyintheory

Critical reception
Nostalgic 64 received widespread critical acclaim upon its release. Mike Madden from Pitchfork Magazine listed it as one of the top 10 albums of 2013 with Threatz listed as the top individual track as well. Lee Castro of Miami New Times called it "one of the best rap projects to come out of Miami in 2013".

Track listing
Credits adapted from Denzel Curry's SoundCloud official account.

Notes
 signifies an additional producer.

Sample Credits
"Zone 3" contains samples of "Choky Choke", performed by DJ Sound.
"N64" contains interpolations of "C.R.E.A.M.", performed by Wu-Tang Clan.
"Talk That Shit" contains interpolations of "Versace", performed by Migos and interpolations of "Strictly 4 My R.V.I.D.X.R.Z.", performed by Denzel Curry.
"A Day in the Life of Denzel Curry, Pt. 2" contains samples of the Billy & Mandy episode "Attack of the Clowns".
”Denny Cascade” contains interpolations of “Gliding Through feat. spaceghostpurrp & Robb Banks” performed by sydneyintheory

References

External links
 
 

2013 debut albums
Denzel Curry albums
Albums produced by Ronny J